The Javelin, also called the Javelin 14 and O'Day Javelin is an American sailing dinghy that was designed by Uffa Fox as a one-design racer and first built in 1960.

Production
The design was built by O'Day Corp. in the United States. The company produced 5100 examples of the design, but it is now out of production.

Design
The Javelin is a recreational sailboat, built predominantly of fiberglass, with wood trim. It has a fractional sloop rig with anodized aluminum spars, a nearly plumb stem, a vertical transom, a transom-hung, kick-up rudder controlled by a tiller and a retractable centerboard. The hull alone displaces  and carries  of galvanized steel ballast. A fixed keel model was produced in small numbers and carries  of iron ballast.

The design is equipped with a lockable storage compartment in the bow and gear lockers under the seats.

The design has a Portsmouth Yardstick racing average handicap of 111.8.

Operational history
In a 1994 review Richard Sherwood described the design as, "a beamy, stable small day sailer. Javelin has an unusually large (nine-foot) cockpit, a gear locker under the seats, and a lockable storage compartment under the deck. She is self-bailing and self-rescuing. The transom is reinforced to take outboards up to eight horsepower."

See also
List of sailing boat types

Similar sailboats
Javelin dinghy (Australasia)
Javelin dinghy (Europe)

References

Dinghies
1960s sailboat type designs
Sailboat type designs by Uffa Fox
Sailboat types built by O'Day Corp.